Rohnerville (formerly Eel River) is an unincorporated community in Humboldt County, California.

The Eel River post office opened in 1857 and changed its name to Rohnerville in 1874 in honor of the town's founder, Henry Rohner.

Early residents were Mary Brown, widow of John Brown the abolitionist, and her daughters, who lived in Rohnerville from 1870 until 1881, when she moved to Saratoga, California. (See John Brown's body#The family moves to California.)

The town is now part of Fortuna, California.

Climate
This region experiences warm (but not hot) and dry summers, with no average monthly temperatures above .  According to the Köppen climate classification system, Rohnerville has a warm-summer Mediterranean climate, abbreviated Csb on climate maps.

See also
 Northwestern Pacific Railroad
 Rohnerville Airport

References

Unincorporated communities in California
1857 establishments in California
Populated places established in 1857